Robert "Bobby" Swim (?–1878) was an American Thoroughbred racing jockey best known for winning the 1876 Kentucky Derby and the 1868 and 1875 editions of the Belmont Stakes, races that would make up the first and third leg of the U. S. Triple Crown series.  

After winning the 1876 Kentucky Derby with Vagrant, Bobby Swim finished second in the 1877 running on Leonard and third in 1878 on Leveler. He was still a top jockey when he died in 1878 but at the time was going to extremes to maintain the required riding weight and combined with excessive alcohol use it led to an early demise.

References

American jockeys
Year of birth missing
1878 deaths